IRC Limited (IRC) is a Hong Kong-based business that is focused on exploring for, developing, and operating industrial commodity projects, particularly in the mining sector. Its operations are centred in the Far East of Russia and in China's Heilongjiang Province.

Background
The company was incorporated on 4 June 2010 in Hong Kong as Thor Limited as an indirect wholly owned subsidiary of Petropavlovsk plc (LSE: POG). In a corporate restructuring, the company acquired Aricom Limited, previously a London-listed iron ore mining company with operations in Russia, from Petropavlovsk plc. The company then changed its name to IRC Limited on 13 August 2010, and adopts its current title IRC Limited since 13 September 2010. IRC becomes listed on the Main Board of the Hong Kong Stock Exchange on 21 October 2010.

On 17 January 2013, IRC entered into a conditional subscription agreement with each of General Nice Development Limited and Minmetals Cheerglory Limited for an investment by the latter in new shares of IRC up to approximately HK$1,845,000,000 (equivalent to approximately US$238,000,000) in aggregate. IRC expects the subscription to be completed by the end of 2014. As of 31 December 2013, Petropavlovsk plc continues to be the largest shareholder of IRC, holding nearly 50% shares of IRC. General Nice Development Limited, another substantial shareholder of IRC, holds over 20% shares.

In December 2021, the major shareholder of IRC, Petropavlovsk plc sold its 31,1% share. The first stake of 29,86% was bought by Stocken Board for 10 mln dollars and resold to Gazprombank, the creditor of IRC, via Cerisier Ventures Limited ("Cerisier") (24,07%) as well as to Dmitry Bakatin via Major Mining Partner (CY) Limited ("Major Mining) (5,79%). The rest of ex-"Petropavlovsk" stake (1,2%) has been bought "UCP" company of Ilya Sherbovich foundation.

On 28 January 2022, Gazprombank (through its wholly-owned subsidiary Cerisier) and Mr. Bakatin (through his wholly-owned company Major Mining) completed the sale and purchase agreements to dispose of their respective entire equity interests in the Company to Nikolai Levitskii pursuant to a sale and purchase agreement between Cerisier and Axiomi for 24.07% of the total issued share capital of the Company; and a sale and purchase agreement between Major Mining and Axiomi for 5.79% of the total issued share capital of the Company.

Operations
The Group's production and development sites are located in Russia's Amur Oblast and Jewish Autonomous Oblast (JAO), near the Chinese border.

Projects
Kimkan & Sutara ("K&S")

K&S, 100% owned by IRC, is located in the Jewish Autonomous Region (EAO) of the Russian Far East. It is the second full-scale mining and processing operation that the Group has developed. The project consists of two principal deposits, Kimkan and Sutara. The K&S Phase I is to produce 3.2 million tonnes of iron ore concentrate per annum with a grade of 65% Fe. According to the development timeline for K&S Phase I project, Sutara deposit will begin to be mined in parallel with Kimkan deposit in 2023, and Sutara’s mine life will be more than 30 years. There is an option for a Phase II expansion to produce a total of 6.3 million tonnes of 65% iron ore concentrate per annum. As an interim development between the two phases, IRC is assessing an option to upgrade the Phase I production facility to increase the production capacity to approximately 4.6 million tonnes per annum.

Garinskoye (Amur)

Garinskoye, 99.6% owned by IRC, is an advanced exploration project. The project provides an opportunity for a low-cost DSO-style operation that can be transformed into a large-scale and long-life open pit mining operation. The project is located in the Amur Region of the Russian Far East, midway between the BAM and Trans-Siberian Railways. With exploration licences for ground covering an area of over 3,500 km2, the project is the largest in the IRC portfolio in terms of area.

Exploration projects & others

Projects

Bolshoi Seym (100% owned), Ilmenite, Amur Region, Russian Far East

SRP (46% owned), Vanadium Pentoxide, Heilongjiang, China

Giproruda (70% owned), Technical mining research and consultancy services, St. Peterburg, Russia

Board of directors

 Nikolai Levitskii, Non-Executive Director and Chairman
 Denis Cherednichenko, Executive Director and Chief Executive Officer
 Dmitry Dobryak, Independent Non-Executive Director
 Natalia Ozhegina, Independent Non-Executive Director
 Vitaly Sheremet, Independent Non-Executive Director
 Alexey Romanenko, Independent Non-Executive Director

References 

Mining companies of Russia
Mining companies of China
Iron ore mining companies
Companies listed on the Hong Kong Stock Exchange
Metal companies of China
Conglomerate companies of China
Multinational companies headquartered in Hong Kong
Conglomerate companies of Hong Kong
Chinese companies established in 2010
2010 establishments in China